Quintus Marcius Barea Sura was a Roman Senator of the first century AD.

Life
Sura was the son of the suffect consul Quintus Marcius Barea Soranus; his brother was the suffect consul Quintus Marcius Barea Soranus. He was the father of Marcia Furnilla, the last wife of Titus, and maternal grandfather of Trajan through his other daughter Marcia.

References

1st-century Romans
Senators of the Roman Empire
Marcii
Nerva–Antonine dynasty
Year of birth unknown
Year of death unknown